The 1971 European Karate Championships, the 6th edition, was held in the sports complex of Coubertine Hall in Paris, France from May 2 to 4, 1971. 1971 was the  year Scotland and Finland were accepted by the EKU and no longer participated as part of Great Britain and there was an introduction of weight classes.

Medalists

Medal table

References

1971
International sports competitions hosted by France
European Karate Championships
European championships in 1971
International sports competitions hosted by Paris
1971 in Paris
Karate competitions in France
May 1971 sports events in Europe